F59 may refer to:
 EMD F59PH, a locomotive
 , an armed merchant cruiser of the Royal New Zealand Navy
 , a Salisbury-class frigate of the Royal Navy
 , a Tribal-class destroyer of the Royal Navy